Altoona–Blair County Airport  is in Martinsburg, Pennsylvania, 14 miles south of Altoona, in Blair County, Pennsylvania. It is owned by the Blair County Airport Authority. The airport has a few airline flights, subsidized by the Essential Air Service program.

Federal Aviation Administration records say the airport had 11,051 passenger boardings (enplanements) in calendar year 2008, 6,439 in 2009 and 4,378 in 2010. The National Plan of Integrated Airport Systems for 2011–2015 categorized it as a primary commercial service airport based on enplanements in 2008 (more than 10,000 per year), but it is a non-primary commercial service airport based on enplanements in 2009 and 2010.

Facilities
The airport covers 320 acres (129 ha) at an elevation of 1,503 feet (458 m). It has two asphalt runways: 3/21 is 5,465 by 100 feet (1,666 x 30 m) and 12/30 is 3,668 by 75 feet (1,118 x 23 m).

In the year ending October 25, 2011, the airport had 23,750 aircraft operations, average 65 per day: 78% general aviation, 22% air taxi, and <1% military. 58 aircraft were then based at the airport: 79% single-engine, 10% multi-engine, 5% jet, 2% helicopter, and 3% ultralight.

The airport has 46 T-hangars that it rents to aircraft owners; construction of more is under way. FBO Penn-Air, Inc provided fuel and repair services; it has closed its operation at Altoona–Blair County Airport, and for now fuel services are being performed by the Altoona–Blair County Airport Authority.

The airport has a La Fiesta Restaurant, accessible from the flight line or from the terminal building.  The airport also offers car rental through Hertz.

Airlines and destinations 

Scheduled passenger service:

US Airways ended non-stop flights to Pittsburgh on July 7, 2007.
United Airlines/Silver Airways ended non-stop flights to Washington–Dulles on September 30, 2014.
The first airline flights were All American Airways DC-3s in 1949; Allegheny Commuter replaced Allegheny's Convair 580s in 1971.

Statistics

References

Other sources 

 Essential Air Service documents (Docket OST-2002-11446) from the U.S. Department of Transportation:
 Order 2002-9-23 (October 1, 2002): selecting Colgan Air, Inc., to provide subsidized Essential Air Service (EAS) at Altoona and Johnstown, Pennsylvania, for a two-year period at a combined annual subsidy rate of $847,576.
 Order 2005-4-9 (April 8, 2005): reselects Colgan Air, Inc., d/b/a U.S. Airways Express, to continue providing essential air service (EAS) at Altoona and Johnstown, Pennsylvania, for a two-year period, and establishes a combined subsidy rate of $1,358,551 per year for service consisting of 18 nonstop round trips each week between Altoona and Washington (Dulles), and 18 nonstop round trips each week between Johnstown and Pittsburgh, with 19-seat Beech 1900D aircraft.
 Order 2007-2-17 (February 16, 2007): selecting Colgan Air Inc., d/b/a US Airways Express, to continue providing essential air service (EAS) at Altoona consisting of 18 weekly nonstop round trips to Washington Dulles, and at Johnstown consisting of 18 weekly nonstop round trips to Pittsburgh. The combined annual subsidy is $2,364,462 based on service with 19-seat Beech 1900D turboprop aircraft for the two-year period beginning June 1, 2007, and all service would be operated as US Airways Express.
 Order 2008-6-10 (June 10, 2008): re-selecting Colgan Air, Inc. d/b/a United Express, to provide subsidized essential air service (EAS) at Altoona and Johnstown, Pennsylvania, at a total annual subsidy rate of $2,788,845, for the period from June 15, 2008, through June 30, 2010.
 Order 2010-5-10 (May 10, 2010): selecting Colgan Air Inc., operating as United Express, to provide essential air service (EAS) at Altoona and Johnstown, Pennsylvania, for a combined annual subsidy of $3,348,294, for the two-year period from July 1, 2010 to June 30, 2012.
 Ninety-Day Notice (March 8, 2012): from Colgan Airlines, Inc. of termination of Essential Air Service at Altoona, Pennsylvania, and Johnstown, Pennsylvania
 Order 2012-3-14 (March 23, 2012): prohibits Colgan Airlines, Inc. d/b/a United Airlines Express, from terminating service at Altoona and Johnstown, PA; Victoria, TX; Staunton, VA; and Beckley, Clarksburg/Fairmont, and Morgantown, WV, for 30 days beyond the end of the 90-day notice period, i.e. July 8, 2012. We are also requesting proposals by April 25, 2012, from air carriers interested in providing replacement Essential Air Service ("EAS") at Victoria, TX; and Staunton, VA, for a new term, with or without subsidy.
 Order 2012-4-30 (April 26, 2012): selecting Silver Airways, formerly Gulfstream International Airways, to provide Essential Air Service (EAS) at Altoona and Johnstown, Pennsylvania, to Washington Dulles International Airport, for a combined annual subsidy of $3,997,187.1 Service to be provided will be 18 weekly nonstop and one-stop round trips over an Altoona-Johnstown-Washington Dulles or Johnstown-Altoona-Washington Dulles routing using 34-seat Saab 340 aircraft for the two-year period beginning when the carrier begins full EAS at both communities.

External links 
 Altoona–Blair County Airport at Pennsylvania DOT Bureau of Aviation
 Aerial image as of April 1994 from USGS The National Map
 

County airports in Pennsylvania
Essential Air Service
Transportation buildings and structures in Blair County, Pennsylvania
Altoona, Pennsylvania